Solo per te Lucia is a 1952 Italian musical melodrama film directed by Franco Rossi and starring Mariella Lotti.

Cast
Mariella Lotti as Lucia
Luigi Tosi as Mario
Paolo Panelli as Tonino
Nerio Bernardi as Luciano
Anna Vita as Liliana
Franco Minervini as Paolo
Claudio Villa
Nilla Pizzi 
Achille Togliani  
Giacomo Rondinella 
Gilberto Mazzi 
Silvio Bagolini 
Marisa Mantovani 
Antonella Lualdi 
Flaminia Jandolo 
Ubaldo Lay  
Tino Scotti 
Cinico Angelini 
Vittorio Caprioli 
Alberto Collo 
Alberto Bonucci 
Nicolò Carosio

References

External links
 
 Solo per te Lucia at Variety Distribution

1952 films
1950s Italian-language films
1950s musical drama films
Italian musical drama films
1952 drama films
Films directed by Franco Rossi
Italian black-and-white films
1950s Italian films